Mehgaon is a City and a nagar panchayat in Bhind district in the Indian state of Madhya Pradesh.

Ramdhan Singh Narwaria was the First MLA of Mehgaon. He served for three terms (1947-1952, 1952-1957, and 1962-1967).

Mehgaon is divided into 15 wards for which elections are held every 5 years. The Mehgaon Nagar Panchayat has population of 21,335 of which 11,462 are males while 9,873 are females as per report released by Census India 2011.

Demographics
Sourav Jain Population of Children with age of 0-6 is 3072 which is 14.40% of total population of Mehgaon (NP). In Mehgaon Nagar Panchayat, Female Sex Ratio is of 861 against state average of 931. Moreover Child Sex Ratio in Mehgaon is around 806 compared to Madhya Pradesh state average of 918. Literacy rate of Mehgaon city is 79.47% higher than state average of 69.32%. In Mehgaon, Male literacy is around 87.42% while female literacy rate is 66.06%.

Mehgaon Nagar Panchayat has total administration over 3,608 houses to which it supplies basic amenities like water and sewerage. It is also authorized to build roads within Nagar Panchayat limits and impose taxes on properties coming under its jurisdiction. Ch.Mukesh Singh Chaturvedi is a popular social activist who happens to be an ex-MLA too. He is very vocal about the problems in the region and actively resolved them with efficiency.
Street Light, Roads & Development conditions are Very Poor in Mehgaon & Needs Rapid attention of authorities towards developmentof City.
Mehgaon Religion Data 2011

Total-21,335

Hindu - 81.32%

Muslim -13.67%

Christian - 0.06%

Sikh - 0.07%

Buddhist - 0.09%

Jain - 76%

Others - 0.04%

Not Stated-0.09%

References

Cities and towns in Bhind district